Malcolm Leslie Lesiter (born 31 January 1937) was Archdeacon of Bedford from 1993 to 2003.

Lesiter was educated at Cranleigh School and Selwyn College, Cambridge. He was ordained in 1964 and began his ordained ministry as a curate in Eastney. He  held incumbencies at Hemel Hempstead (1971–73), Leavesden (1973 – 1988), and Radlett (1988–1993).

References

1937 births
People educated at Cranleigh School
Alumni of Selwyn College, Cambridge
Archdeacons of Bedford
Living people
People from Three Rivers District